Knuckle sign is a radiologic sign used for diagnosing pulmonary embolism. The presence of a blood clot in the branch of a pulmonary artery can resemble a knuckle in CT and X-ray images, which is why it is called knuckle sign. It is frequently seen along with other signs of pulmonary embolism, such as the Fleischner sign and Westermark sign.

References

Radiologic signs